Mecha Builders (also known as Sesame Street Mecha Builders) is a computer-animated children's television series and a spin-off of Sesame Street, that began production in May 2020. The series is co-produced by the United States organization Sesame Workshop and Canadian animation producer Guru Studio, which is known for PAW Patrol and True and the Rainbow Kingdom.

The project was announced in October 2019. Visual development was started remotely, due to the COVID-19 pandemic. The series intended to add 80 staff as it entered production.

The first episode premiered as a sneak peek on April 30, 2022 on Cartoon Network within its Cartoonito pre-school block, before officially premiering on May 9, 2022. The series is also available on the streaming service HBO Max. A sneak peek of the first episode was released on April 26, 2022.

Plot
The series focuses on “mecha” versions of three legacy characters: Mecha Abby Cadabby, Mecha Elmo, and Mecha Cookie Monster, all reimagined as mechanical beings with the power to enlarge to giant size in addition to unique built-in tools and gadgets. The trio usually solve a problem using a three-step formula: plan, test, and solve. Later episodes would add a fourth main cast member in the form of Elmo's puppy Tango.

Much like the Muppet Babies reboot, the animated nature of the show's visual style allows more expression in the characters besides body language and opening mouths.

Characters

Main
 Mecha Abby Cadabby (voiced by Leslie Carrara-Rudolph): one of the three Mecha Builders. Mecha Abby is the sole female of the main trio, and acts as the group's leader. Her gadgets include jet boosters in her wings, a flying hologram generator used to outline their plans, and she has the ability to stretch her arms to great lengths in order to reach faraway objects. She represents the planning aspect of the show's problem-solving formula.
 Mecha Elmo (voiced by Ryan Dillon): one of the three Mecha Builders. Mecha Elmo has high technical powers and is able to assemble many of the devices the team needs (often with some help). His gadgets include wheels in his feet, a safety helmet and visor, and his forearms have the ability to morph his hands into any tool needed for the job, though he typically has to try more than once to get the correct tool. He represents the testing aspect of the show's problem-solving formula.
 Mecha Cookie Monster (voiced by David Rudman): one of the three Mecha Builders. Mecha Cookie Monster is typically excited when it comes to food and while good-hearted tends to be both dim-witted and skeptical. His gadgets include springs in his feet, the ability to see things very far away (dubbed the "Goggly Vision"), and his right hand can morph into a large hammer head (dubbed the "Handy Hammer Hand"), though both hands can also merge into a large rolling drum. He represents the solving aspect of the show's problem-solving formula. After a Mecha Builder shrinks (going "Mecha Tiny") or enlarges (going "Mecha Giant"), Mecha Cookie Monster's chest badge also displays the Cookie Clock, a timer that shows how much time the team has left before they return to normal size.
 Mecha Tango: a fourth Mecha Builder, and Mecha Elmo's pet puppy. Energetic and unable to communicate outside of dog noises, her abilities include super hearing and her "Turbo Tail", in which her tail spins rapidly to allow her to fly.

Minor
Izzy: a young girl who is often around much of the Mecha Builders' cases.

Additional voices include Alan Aisenberg, Dave Droxler, Krystina Alabado, Jaba Keh, Kaitlin Becker, Ezra Knight, Chris Cafero, Martin P. Robinson, Lilli Cooper, Chanel Umoh, Jorge Cordova and Matt Vogel.

Episodes

Broadcast
Canadian preschool channel Treehouse TV started airing Mecha Builders on May 15, 2022.

On January 10, 2023, Channel 5 acquired the UK broadcast rights to the series for their Milkshake! strand, within a Spring 2023 window. The secondary characters will be redubbed with British voice actors as part of an effort by Milkshake! to tell stories aimed for a British preschool audience.

References

2020s American animated television series
2020s American children's television series
2020s Canadian animated television series
2020s Canadian children's television series
2020s preschool education television series
2022 American television series debuts
2022 Canadian television series debuts
American animated television spin-offs
American children's animated adventure television series
American children's animated comic science fiction television series
American children's animated superhero television series
American computer-animated television series
American preschool education television series
Animated preschool education television series
Animated television series about children
Animated television series about robots
Canadian animated television spin-offs
Canadian children's animated adventure television series
Canadian children's animated comic science fiction television series
Canadian children's animated superhero television series
Canadian computer-animated television series
Canadian preschool education television series
Television series by Sesame Workshop
Sesame Street
Cartoon Network original programming
Cartoonito original programming